Lazbuddie High School or Lazbuddie School is a public high school located in Lazbuddie, Texas (USA) and is classified as a 1A school by the UIL.  It is part of the Lazbuddie Independent School District located in southeastern Parmer County. In 2015, the school was rated "Met Standard" by the Texas Education Agency.

Athletics
The Lazbuddie Longhorns compete in cross country, 6-man football, basketball, golf, tennis, and track.

State Title
Boys Track - 
1961(B)

Band
Marching Band Sweepstakes Champions - 
1989(1A)

References

External links
Lazbuddie ISD
List of Six-man football stadiums in Texas

Schools in Parmer County, Texas
Public high schools in Texas
Public middle schools in Texas
Public elementary schools in Texas